Landin is a surname. Notable people with the surname include:

 Peter J. Landin (1930–2009), British computer scientist
 Mark Landin, municipality in Brandenburg, Germany
 Niklas Landin Jacobsen (born 1988), Danish handballer
 Luis Ángel Landín (born 1985), Mexican footballer

See also
 Landing (disambiguation)